Mavis Lilian Batey, MBE (née Lever; 5 May 1921 – 12 November 2013), was a British code-breaker during World War II. She was one of the leading female codebreakers at Bletchley Park.

She later became a historian of gardening who campaigned to save historic parks and gardens, and an author. Batey was awarded the Veitch Memorial Medal in 1985, and made a Member of the Order of the British Empire (MBE) in 1987, in both cases for her work on the conservation of gardens.

Early life
Mavis Lilian Lever was born on 5 May 1921 in Dulwich to her seamstress mother and postal worker father. She was brought up in Norbury and went to Coloma Convent Girls' School in Croydon. She was studying German at University College, London at the outbreak of World War II:

I was concentrating on German romantics and then I realised the German romantics would soon be overhead and I thought well, I really ought to do something better for the war effort. 

She decided to interrupt her university studies. Originally, she applied to be a nurse, but discovered that her linguistic skills were in high demand.

Codebreaker

At first she was employed by the London Section to check the personal columns of The Times for coded spy messages. Then, in 1940, she was recruited to work as a codebreaker at Bletchley Park. She worked as an assistant to Dilly Knox, and was closely involved in the decryption effort before the Battle of Matapan. According to The Daily Telegraph, she became so familiar with the styles of individual enemy operators that she could determine that two of them had a girlfriend called Rosa. Batey had developed a successful technique that could be used elsewhere.

Although Batey was just 19, she started working on the Italian Naval Enigma machine, and by late March 1941 she effectively broke into their framework, deciphering a message which said "Today's the day minus three". She and her colleagues worked for three days and nights and discovered that the Italians were intending to assault a Royal Navy convoy transporting supplies from Cairo to Greece. The messages they deciphered provided a detailed plan of the Italian assault, which led to the destruction by an Allied force of much of the Italian naval force off Cape Matapan, on the coast of Greece. The leader of the Matapan attack, Admiral Andrew Cunningham, later visited Bletchley Park to thank Knox, Batey, and her fellow code-breakers for making his victory possible.

Apart from being a talented code-breaker (he had broken the Zimmermann Telegram in World War I), Knox was a noted classics scholar, and wrote a poem to celebrate the Allied success at Matapan. He included a stanza dedicated to Batey and the key role she had played in the victory:
"When Cunningham won at Matapan, By the grace of God and Mavis, 'Nigro simillima cygno est,' praise Heaven, A very 'rara avis.' " ("Like the black swan, she is, praise heaven, a very rare bird".)

It was, she later said, "very heady stuff for a 19-year-old".

In December 1941 she broke a message between Belgrade and Berlin that enabled Knox's team to work out the wiring of the Abwehr Enigma, an Enigma machine previously thought to be unbreakable. Later, Batey broke another Abwehr machine, the GGG. This enabled the British to be able to read the Abwehr messages and confirm that the Germans believed the Double-Cross intelligence they were being fed by the double agents who were recruited by Britain as spies.

While at Bletchley Park she met Keith Batey, a mathematician and fellow codebreaker whom she married in 1942.

Publications

Mavis Batey wrote a biography of Dilly Knox: ‘Dilly: The Man Who Broke Enigmas’.  The book gives a summary of the government codes and cypher school's codebreaking operation in Bletchley Park. It also describes her code breaking of the Italian Enigma which contributed to the British Navy's success at the Battle of Cape Matapan.

Later life and awards
Batey spent some time after 1945 in the Diplomatic Service, and then brought up three children: two daughters and a son. She published a number of books on garden history, as well as some relating to Bletchley Park, and served as president of the Garden History Society, of which she became secretary in 1971.

She was awarded the Veitch Memorial Medal in 1985, and made a Member of the Order of the British Empire (MBE) in 1987, in both cases for her work on the conservation of gardens.

Batey, aged 92 and a widow since 2010, died on 12 November 2013.

In 2005, The Gardens Trust held the first Annual Mavis Batey Essay Prize, a competition geared towards international students who are enrolled in a university, institution of higher education or who have recently graduated from one. The award celebrates Batey's achievements and advocacy in gardening. 2020 was be the sixteenth time that the competition was held.

Works

References

External links

 'The Independent' article
 Bletchley podcast interview with Mavis Batey
The Papers of Mavis Batey held at Churchill Archives Centre, Cambridge
 "Batey née Lever, Mavis Lilian (1921–2013), code-breaker and garden historian" Oxford Dictionary of National Biography. 2017. accessed 4 February 2020.
https://soundcloud.com/girls_talk_math/mavis-batey?in=girls_talk_math/sets/summer-2019-at-umd-college-park Podcast on Mavis Batey by Girls Talk Math UMD

1921 births
2013 deaths
English historians
British women historians
British cryptographers
Members of the Order of the British Empire
Veitch Memorial Medal recipients
Alumni of University College London
Bletchley Park people
English garden writers
Bletchley Park women